Chen Chiung-ho (born 15 January 1982, in Taiwan) is a Taiwanese baseball player who currently plays for the Chinatrust Brothers of Chinese Professional Baseball League. He currently plays as second baseman for the Elephants. He could play as three positions: second baseman, shortstop, or third baseman.

Career statistics

See also
 Chinese Professional Baseball League
 Brother Elephants

References

External links

 

1982 births
Living people
Brother Elephants players
Baseball players from Tainan
2013 World Baseball Classic players